Patrick McKee (born 15 June 1988) is an Irish former politician. He is a member of Fianna Fáil, and was formerly a member of Renua and was their candidate in the 2015 Carlow-Kilkenny Dáil by-election.

Background
McKee was born in June 1988. He attended secondary school at St Kieran's College until 2006, going on to graduate with a Bachelor of Arts in Law and Business from Waterford Institute of Technology in 2010. In 2011 he received a Bachelor of Laws degree from University College Cork. Since 2012 McKee has worked as a trainee solicitor at W.A. Smithwick & Son, Solicitors in Kilkenny. McKee publicly came out as a gay man in 2011 during an interview on local radio.

Political career
McKee joined Ógra Fianna Fáil in 2006 and established the Thomas Francis Meagher Cumann during his time in WIT. During his time in Waterford he worked closely with former Minister for Transport Martin Cullen TD.

McKee moved through the ranks of Fianna Fáil's youth wing, holding positions both locally and nationally. He was elected Leinster representative on Ógra Fianna Fáil's National Youth Committee in 2011.

During 2010 McKee worked as an intern in Seanad Éireann for Senator Mark Daly.

In 2013 he declared his candidacy for Kilkenny County Council in the forthcoming elections and in May 2014 was elected in the Kilkenny City West constituency as a member of Fianna Fáil. McKee is currently the youngest member of the Council. He was elected chairman of the Joint Policing Committee and leas-cathaoirleach of the Council. In March 2015 McKee left Fianna Fáil amid rumors of homophobic bullying and joined the newly formed Renua party. His departure prompted criticism from a number of high-profile Fianna Fáil colleagues, including Michael McGrath and Timmy Dooley. He later stated that before joining Renua, he had considered joining Sinn Féin. In December 2016, McKee left Renua Ireland and became an independent. He returned to Fianna Fáil in 2017, which was met with criticism from some members of the party and prompted comment from Micheál Martin and a number of board members of the party to resign.

He publicly apologised for comments he made about Ruth Coppinger on Twitter in February 2018. In November 2018, McKee announced he would not be standing for re-election, but remains a member of Fianna Fáil.

References

Alumni of University College Cork
Alumni of Waterford Institute of Technology
Fianna Fáil politicians
Gay politicians
Irish LGBT politicians
LGBT conservatism
Living people
Local councillors in County Kilkenny
Politicians from County Kilkenny
Renua Ireland politicians
1988 births
Independent politicians in Ireland